Jayden Oosterwolde (born 26 April 2001) is a Dutch professional footballer who plays as a defender for Turkish Süper Lig club Fenerbahçe.

Club career

Twente
Born in Zwolle, Oosterwolde began his career with local club ZAC before moving to the FC Twente youth academy in 2012. In June 2020, he signed his first contract with the FC Twente/Heracles Academy, the shared U21 side of the two clubs, after emerging from the Twente football academy. He was supposed to be part of the U21 football team in the 2020–21 season, but after trials at both Heracles and FC Twente, both clubs wanted to sign him. He eventually chose Twente, where he signed a three-year contract in July 2020 and joined their first team.

On 12 September 2020, he made his professional debut as a starter in a home match against Fortuna Sittard. He provided the assist from which Queensy Menig scored the 1–0 goal as Twente won 2–0.

Parma
On 31 January 2022, Oosterwolde signed with Parma in Italy on loan with an obligation to buy.

Fenerbahçe
On 30 January 2023, Oosterwolde signed a four-and-a-half-year deal with Turkish side Fenerbahçe for a reported fee of €6 million.

Career statistics

Personal life
Born in the Netherlands, Oosterwolde is of Surinamese and Indonesian descent.

References

External links

 Jayden Oosterwolde at Voetbal International 

2001 births
Living people
Sportspeople from Zwolle
Dutch footballers
Dutch sportspeople of Surinamese descent
Dutch people of Indonesian descent
Association football defenders
FC Twente players
Parma Calcio 1913 players
Fenerbahçe S.K. footballers
Eredivisie players
Serie B players
Süper Lig players
Dutch expatriate footballers
Expatriate footballers in Italy
Expatriate footballers in Turkey
Dutch expatriate sportspeople in Italy
Dutch expatriate sportspeople in Turkey
Footballers from Overijssel